Darwin Paul Bromley (October 23, 1950 – January 2, 2019) was an attorney and a game designer who had worked primarily on board games.

Career
Attorney Darwin Bromley was a railroad game fan, so in 1980 he founded the company Mayfair Games to publish a railroad game of his own; the company was named for the Chicago neighborhood where it was founded. Bromley soon brought Bill Fawcett on as a partner in Mayfair Games, and together they designed the game Empire Builder (1980). Bromley was involved with the Chicago Wargaming Association's convention, CWAcon, where Mayfair's first fantasy adventures in their new Role Aids game line were run: Beastmaker Mountain (1982), Nanorien Stones (1982) and Fez I (1982). With Bromley's legal expertise, he felt that Mayfair could legally use TSR's trademarks as long as they were careful, so beginning with their Dwarves (1982) supplement Mayfair made it clear that they were not the trademark holders by printing on the cover: "Advanced Dungeons & Dragons is a trademark of TSR Hobbies, Inc. Use of the trademark NOT sanctioned by the holder."

Bromley was an early adopter of German games, and imported German originals to distribute in the United States. Bromley met Jay Tummelson of 54°40' Orphyte discussed about the companies working together. Tummelson joined Mayfair in 1995, spending the next two years licensing German games under the direction of Bromley so that Mayfair could produce new American versions; under Tummelson, German classics such as Grand Prix, Modern Art, Manhattan, Streetcar, and The Settlers of Catan were published in the United States for the first time in 1996. Bromley was the conceptual designer of Sim City: The Card Game.

 

In 2018, Bromley made a donation, on behalf of himself and his late brother Peter, to The Strong National Museum of Play. It was the single largest donation in the history of the museum.

He served as vice president of the GAMA Trade Show, and in 1990 he received the GAMA Merit of Service award. He died on January 2, 2019, at the age of 68 following a long illness.

References

External links
 Darwin Bromley :: Pen & Paper RPG Database archive

1950 births
2019 deaths
Board game designers
Lawyers from Huntington, West Virginia